Aleksei Konstantinovich Zagulyaev (1924–2007), often spelled as Zagulajev, was a Russian entomologist.

References

Russian entomologists
2007 deaths
1924 births
Soviet entomologists